WGNT (channel 27) is a television station licensed to Portsmouth, Virginia, United States, serving the Hampton Roads area as an affiliate of The CW. It is owned by the E. W. Scripps Company alongside Norfolk-licensed CBS affiliate WTKR (channel 3). Both stations share studios on Boush Street in downtown Norfolk, while WGNT's transmitter is located in Suffolk, Virginia.

History

WTOV-TV
WGNT was preceded on channel 27 by WTOV-TV, a commercial independent station owned by Commonwealth Broadcasting which signed on the air December 6, 1953. It was the third television station in the Hampton Roads area, and the second on the UHF band (WVEC-TV, which later moved to VHF channel 13, signed on over channel 15 three months earlier). WTOV later became an affiliate of the DuMont Television Network. Channel 27 was on the air for limited hours, and had very limited viewership because it was impossible at the time to watch UHF stations without buying a converter; television set makers were not required to include UHF tuners until 1964. Even with a converter, WTOV's picture was not very clear. As such, it was never a factor in the Hampton Roads market.

The death knell for channel 27 sounded in late 1956, when Tidewater Teleradio, owners of WAVY radio (now WGPL) won a construction permit for a new VHF station on channel 10, which became WAVY-TV when it signed on in September 1957. Combined with dwindling revenues and the impending loss of DuMont programming at the end of the 1955–56 season, WTOV went dark in 1958. The WTOV-TV callsign is now used on an NBC affiliate in Steubenville, Ohio.

The CBN years
In July 1960, M.G. "Pat" Robertson, son of Virginia United States Senator A. Willis Robertson and an attorney-turned-Southern Baptist minister, acquired WTOV-TV's license and filed for a new construction permit on channel 27—unrelated to the previous WTOV-TV. Under the ownership of Robertson's Christian Broadcasting Network, channel 27 returned to the air on October 1, 1961, as WYAH-TV, with "YAH" standing for "Yahweh" according to some sources (including Pat Robertson's autobiography, Shout it From the Housetops) and "You Are Holy" according to others. Pat Robertson's first choice for call letters was WTFC ("Television For Christ"). Those call letters were announced by Robertson to local media, before the Federal Communications Commission (FCC) informed him that they were unavailable.

WYAH-TV initially broadcast from studios on Spratley Street west of downtown Portsmouth. At first, channel 27 was on the air four hours a day Monday through Saturday evenings, and was dark on Sunday. The station's early programming consisted of Christian teaching programs hosted by Robertson, other shows produced by local churches, and some syndicated televangelists' repeats of Sunday programs. The station almost went dark in 1963, and so it conducted a special telethon urging 700 people to donate $10 a month, continuing to hold such telethons every other month. A few years later, the locally produced daily talk program would be named for the telethons, The 700 Club.

Beginning in 1966, Jim and Tammy Faye Bakker hosted and produced a local children's program called Come On Over (later called Jim and Tammy). This consisted of puppet shows, skits, prayers, singalongs, games, stories and religious short films such as Davey and Goliath and JOT. The program was eventually seen in Canada, and achieved widespread syndication throughout the United States. Pat Robertson also appeared on-camera as well, as host of additional Bible-teaching programs. Weekends consisted of televangelists such as Oral Roberts, Kathryn Kuhlman, Jerry Falwell and Billy Graham, and local church services. WYAH-TV was one of the first Christian television stations in the United States and was a viewer-supported station with a commercial license, though it sold blocks of time to other ministries. By 1966, the station was somewhat financially solvent.

By September 1967, WYAH-TV was broadcasting in color, and began commercial operation part-time about an hour a day. Initial non-religious fare included low-budget films, travelogues, and local productions. In June 1970, channel 27 activated a new, more powerful transmitter that boosted its effective radiated power to 2.25 million watts. This not only gave it a coverage area comparable to Hampton Roads' Big Three stations, but also provided secondary coverage to the eastern fringe of the Richmond market. Robertson sent a newsletter to donors boasting that channel 27 was now the most powerful station in Virginia.

By 1973 the station had increased its on-air hours, signing on at 10 a.m. and its schedule of secular programming, which coincided with the end of Jim and Tammy show, which initially moved from the 6 p.m. time slot to the noon time slot on March 12, 1973. A few months later the show moved to the 9 a.m. time slot for the summer. Jim and Tammy left at the end of August 1973, their last show airing August 31, 1973 (reportedly, Pat Robertson had fired Jim Bakker from the station over philosophical differences, though Robertson stated they left on their own will due to plans to relegate their show to Sundays); the Bakkers soon after moved on to co-found the Trinity Broadcasting Network with Paul Crouch before going on their own in 1975. By September 1973, WYAH-TV was on the air 20 hours a day as more of a mainstream independent station, with an expanded lineup of syndicated shows and religious programming, including airings of The 700 Club two times a day; Sundays were still devoted entirely to religious programs. Also, in 1972, Pat Robertson stepped down from his role as general manager and hired one (who likely played a role in the Bakkers' departure) to grow the station and be responsible for day-to-day operation, while Robertson would concentrate on taking his 700 Club program national, which occurred in 1974.

The Hampton Roads area had become one of the smallest markets in the U.S. with a commercial independent station. But while WYAH-TV had evolved into a conventional independent station by this time, its programming policy was decidedly conservative, in keeping with Robertson's Baptist/charismatic religious views. For many years, it muted any dialogue containing profanity. In some cases, it opted to preempt whole episodes out of concern for their subject matter. For example, at least two episodes of Gilligan's Island never aired on the station, because of content centering (albeit in a comical fashion) around ghosts and vampires. However, channel 27 offered a wide variety of programming and was a stronger independent than many secular-owned independent stations at that time. Still, Hampton Roads viewers got other choices once cable arrived in the area in the late 1960s, as WTTG and WDCA from Washington, D.C. became available on cable systems as well.

With WYAH's growth and profitability, CBN began expanding to other markets. The ministry launched WHAE-TV (now WANF) in Atlanta in 1971; purchased KXTX-TV in Dallas in 1972; and signed on WXNE-TV (now WFXT) in Boston in 1977. These stations formed the Continental Broadcasting Network, a wholly owned subsidiary of CBN, with WYAH-TV as the flagship station. Locally, channel 27 faced competition for the first time in 1979 when WTVZ (channel 33) was signed on by TVX Broadcast Group. The new, locally owned independent purchased general-entertainment programming–much of which was passed over by CBN, having been deemed too racy for the ministry's liking. The impact was near-immediate as WTVZ equaled, then surpassed, WYAH (the station officially dropped the -TV suffix from its call sign in June 1983) in viewership.

By the late 1980s, Continental Broadcasting had become too profitable to remain under the CBN banner without endangering CBN's non-profit status. With this in mind, Robertson began selling off his over-the-air stations and eventually sold off his directly-owned cable network, the CBN Family Channel (the latter going to his son Tim's company, International Family Entertainment; it has gone through several ownership changes since and is now called Freeform). In 1986; CBN announced plans to sell WYAH and KXTX to Family Group Broadcasting, which had agreed to retain the same personnel and programming, though the deal ultimately fell through.

Ultimately, in 1989, WYAH was sold to Centennial Broadcasting. The new owners renamed the station WGNT on September 13, which stands for "Greater Norfolk Television"; despite the call sign similarity, they had no connection to the Tribune Broadcasting family of stations with branding descended from WGN-TV in Chicago.

Centennial ownership, UPN affiliation, Viacom ownership, and Local TV/Dreamcatcher Broadcasting ownerships
After Centennial took control, WGNT initially ran shows inherited from the CBN days, but ended the station's decades-long practice of censoring the small amount of profanity from off-network syndicated programming. As the 1990s began, Centennial began mixing in more modern programming, such as talk shows like The Rush Limbaugh Show, Ricki Lake and Jerry Springer and the Prime Time Entertainment Network programming service. In 1991, it dropped the 11 p.m. repeat of The 700 Club. Since 1996, WGNT aired the long-running court show in syndication, Judge Judy. By 2003, the series was completely dropped from WGNT's schedule, removing the last link to its CBN days. However, it has aired on numerous outlets in the area in the years since then; and following a brief period in late 2016 when The 700 Club returned to WGNT after WTKR launched a local lifestyle program called The Coast Live, the show is now on its second stint on WVBT.

On January 16, 1995, WGNT became a charter affiliate of the United Paramount Network (UPN) and branded itself as "UPN 27". In 1997, Paramount Stations Group bought WGNT for $42.5 million, making it a UPN owned-and-operated station. This made WGNT the only network-owned station in the Hampton Roads market. Viacom, Paramount's owner, later bought CBS as well. When Viacom split into two separate companies in December 2005 with its broadcasting properties remaining with the original Viacom, which was restructured as CBS Corporation, WGNT and the other UPN O&Os became part of the new company through its CBS Television Stations subsidiary.

On January 24, 2006, CBS and Time Warner announced that UPN and The WB would shut down to form a new jointly-owned service featuring series from both networks as well as newer series, The CW Television Network. As part of the announcement, the new network signed a 10-year affiliation deal with 11 of CBS' UPN stations, including WGNT. Channel 27 rebranded itself as "CW 27" in the summer of 2006 and officially became the Hampton Roads area's CW affiliate on September 18, 2006. On June 14, 2010, Local TV, owner of CBS affiliate WTKR, acquired WGNT. Shortly after the announcement, Local TV took over WGNT's operations through a local marketing agreement as the company's first CW station, making it a sister station to WTKR (eventually creating the first legal duopoly in the Hampton Roads market once the purchase was finalized).

On July 1, 2013, Local TV announced it was merging with Tribune Company in a $2.75 billion deal. At the time, Tribune owned The Daily Press in Newport News.  Due to FCC regulations barring newspaper-television cross ownership within a single market (although Tribune has maintained cross-ownership waivers for its newspaper-television station combinations in four other media markets), Tribune announced it would spin off WTKR and WGNT, along with WNEP-TV in Scranton–Wilkes-Barre, Pennsylvania, to Dreamcatcher Broadcasting, an unrelated company owned by former Tribune Company executive Ed Wilson. Tribune will provide services to the stations through a shared services agreement, and will hold an option to buy back WTKR and WGNT outright in the future. Tribune later announced on July 10, 2013, that it would spin off its newspaper division (including the Daily Press) into a separate company, the Tribune Publishing Company, in 2014, pending shareholder and regulatory approval. The sale was completed on December 27.

Aborted sale to Sinclair Broadcast Group
On May 8, 2017, Hunt Valley, Maryland-based Sinclair Broadcast Group—which has owned MyNetworkTV affiliate WTVZ (channel 33) since 1996—entered into an agreement to acquire Tribune Media for $3.9 billion, plus the assumption of $2.7 billion in Tribune-held debt. While WTKR would not have been in conflict with existing FCC in-market ownership rules and could have been acquired by Sinclair in any event, the group was precluded from acquiring WGNT directly as broadcasters are not currently allowed to legally own more than two full-power television stations in a single market (both WTVZ-TV and WGNT rank below the ratings threshold that forbids common ownership of two of the four highest-rated stations by total day viewership in a single market). Given the group's tendency to use such agreements to circumvent FCC ownership rules, Sinclair could have opted to either take over the operations of WTKR/WGNT or transfer ownership of and retain operational responsibilities for WTVZ-TV through a local marketing agreement with one of its partner companies.

Less than one month after the FCC voted to have the deal reviewed by an administrative law judge amid "serious concerns" about Sinclair's forthrightness in its applications to sell certain conflict properties, on August 9, 2018, Tribune announced it would terminate the Sinclair deal, intending to seek other M&A opportunities. Tribune also filed a breach of contract lawsuit in the Delaware Chancery Court, alleging that Sinclair engaged in protracted negotiations with the FCC and the DOJ over regulatory issues, refused to sell stations in markets where it already had properties (such as KAUT-TV), and proposed divestitures to parties with ties to Sinclair executive chair David D. Smith that were rejected or highly subject to rejection to maintain control over stations it was required to sell.

Sale to Nexstar Media Group and resale to Scripps
On December 3, 2018, Irving, Texas–based Nexstar Media Group—which has owned WAVY-TV and Fox affiliate WVBT (channel 43) since January 2017—announced it would acquire the assets of Tribune Media for $6.4 billion in cash and debt. Nexstar was precluded from acquiring WTKR/WGNT directly or indirectly while owning WAVY/WVBT, as FCC regulations prohibit common ownership of more than two stations in the same media market, or two or more of the four highest-rated stations in the market. (WAVY and WTKR consistently rank among the top four in terms of total-day viewership in the Norfolk–Virginia Beach–Hampton Roads market, while WVBT and WGNT have occasionally rotated between fourth and fifth place, a situation that allowed for Media General and, later, Nexstar to acquire WVBT directly in their respective group acquisitions involving the WAVY/WVBT duopoly. Furthermore, any attempt by Nexstar to assume the operations of WTKR/WGNT through local marketing or shared services agreements would have been subject to regulatory hurdles that could have delayed completion of the FCC and Justice Department's review and approval process for the acquisition.) As such, on January 31, 2019, Nexstar announced that WGNT, WTKR, and WNEP would be sold to independent third parties in order to address ownership conflicts involving existing Nexstar properties in both markets. On March 20, 2019, the Cincinnati-based E. W. Scripps Company announced it would purchase WTKR and WGNT from Nexstar upon consummation of the merger, marking Scripps' entry into Virginia, as part of the company's sale of nineteen Nexstar- and Tribune-operated stations to Scripps and Tegna Inc. (who had acquired WVEC-TV in 2014) in separate deals worth $1.32 billion. The sale was approved by the FCC on September 16 and was completed on September 19.

Programming
Syndicated programs currently broadcast on WGNT include Dr. Phil and Judge Judy among others.

Newscasts
In 1995, WTKR began to produce the market's first prime time local newscast, a half-hour program at 10 p.m. called NewsChannel 3 at 10 on UPN 27. After Paramount Stations Group acquired WGNT in 1997, new management cancelled the newscast that December citing a shift to an entertainment-focused programming direction.

The 10 p.m. time period was used for off-network repeats until June 29, 2015, when the weeknight primetime newscast returned under the name WGNT News at 10 - Powered by NewsChannel 3. This is WTKR's second attempt at a weeknight 10 p.m. newscast for WGNT.

In July 2011, WGNT management announced that local news programming would return to the station. The station debuted a two-hour morning newscast from 7 to 9 a.m., featuring the anchor team from sister station WTKR's morning program. Initially slated to launch on August 29, the newscast's debut was moved up to August 25 to provide coverage of Hurricane Irene. At some point afterwards, a half-hour 10 p.m. newscast began airing on weekends (unusual as primetime newscasts on most television stations typically air either seven nights a week or Monday through Fridays only), followed by a half-hour program recapping stories sister station WTKR broadcast over the past week in their "Taking Action, Getting Results" franchise. Although the weeknight 10 p.m. newscast returned to WGNT on June 29, 2015, the weekend evening newscasts still remain.

On July 7, 2014, WGNT debuted a half-hour 7 p.m. newscast featuring former morning anchor Laila Muhammad, Les Smith and chief meteorologist Patrick Rockey. It is the first newscast at that time slot in the Hampton Roads area.

Technical information

Subchannels
The station's digital signal is multiplexed:

WGNT became a charter affiliate of Antenna TV on January 4, 2011, it is carried on WGNT digital subchannel 27.2. Originally, the channel was planned to be on sister station WTKR digital subchannel 3.2. Coincidentally, several shows seen on Antenna TV have aired locally on channel 27 during the 1970s under CBN ownership.

Analog-to-digital conversion
WGNT began digital broadcasts on channel 50 on July 15, 2002. The station discontinued regular programming on its analog signal, over UHF channel 27, on June 12, 2009, as part of the federally mandated transition from analog to digital television. The station's digital signal remained on its pre-transition UHF channel 50, using PSIP to display WGNT's virtual channel as 27 on digital television receivers.

As part of the SAFER Act in the DTV Delay Act, WGNT was required to keep its analog signal on for one month to inform viewers of the digital television transition, which at the time, was the only owned and operated station in Hampton Roads; it was a CW O&O until 2010. From June 12 to July 12, 2009, the analog signal consisted of a loop of public service announcements regarding the digital transition, while the digital channel was used for normal programming.

Out of market cable carriage
WGNT is carried in Roanoke Rapids, North Carolina, which is part of the Raleigh–Durham DMA. It is the only Hampton Roads television station carried.

References

External links

GNT
The CW affiliates
Antenna TV affiliates
Grit (TV network) affiliates
Dabl affiliates
E. W. Scripps Company television stations
Television channels and stations established in 1961
1961 establishments in Virginia
Portsmouth, Virginia